"10 Minutes" is the debut single by South Korean singer Lee Hyori from her debut studio album Stylish...E, which was released through DSP Media and CJ E&M on August 13, 2003. A hip hop and dance number, "10 Minutes" was written by MayBee with production handled by Kim Do-hyun. Following its release, the song became a commercial hit in South Korea and spurred numerous musical and fashion trends at the time—its popularity gave way to what domestic media dubbed as the "Hyori Syndrome".

The accompanying music video for "10 Minutes" was directed by Seo Hyun-seung; it was initially banned from broadcast by SBS, which judged its choreography to be too erotic. Lee promoted the song with live performances on various South Korean music programs throughout August and September, including Music Camp and Inkigayo. The song received multiple accolades at year-end award shows, including Most Popular Music Video at the 2003 Mnet Music Video Festival and the Grand Prize at the annual KBS Music Awards.

Background 

Well known in South Korea as a member of girl group Fin.K.L managed under DSP Media, the group released their last studio album Eternity in March 2002; the record peaked at number two on the MIAK monthly albums chart and sold over 250,000 copies. Beginning in 2003, the members began exploring individual activities, thus putting group activities in a temporary hiatus. Lee Hyori embarked on a solo career with the release of her debut studio album Stylish...E, which spawned the lead single "10 Minutes".

Written by musician and lyricist MayBee with production handled by Kim Do-hyun, the track is primarily a hip hop and dance number that lyrically conveys how Lee can seduce a man in ten minutes.

Promotion

Music video 
The accompanying music video was directed by Seo Hyun-seung, who would later become a major director for artists under YG Entertainment. Upon the release of the video, however, television network SBS banned it from public broadcast due to dance moves resembling that of sex, which SBS judged inappropriate for television. A re-edited version of the video with the scenes removed was soon sent to the network and was made available for broadcast. Nevertheless, the video was well received—in an internet survey ranking the 100 best Korean music videos conducted by MTV Korea in July 2004, "10 Minutes" ranked at number three.

Live performances 
To promote "10 Minutes" and Stylish...E, Lee made appearances at various live concerts and weekly music programs following its release. On August 16, Lee made her first performance as a solo artist since Fin.K.L at the 2003 Star Ting Concert, where she performed "10 Minutes" and "One Two Three N'Four", despite a recording mishap. The following day, she made her live television debut with both songs on the music program Inkigayo; she continued to promote the song on different music programs throughout August and September. On November 27, she performed the song live at the 2003 Mnet Music Video Festival, where she was the most nominated act of the night. At the 2008 Mnet Km Music Festival, Lee and boy group Big Bang performed together a medley of their songs, which included parts of "10 Minutes".

Awards 

"10 Minutes" won numerous accolades, including the Most Popular Music Video daesang at the 2003 Mnet Music Video Festival and the Grand Prize at the annual KBS Music Awards. It additionally received two bonsang prizes at the latter ceremony and the 18th Golden Disc Awards.

Cultural impact 
Lee's solo debut with "10 Minutes" has been noted by publications as the mark of her transition to a primarily sexual image. The Korea Herald noted how the track led to a wave of interest that came to be known as "Hyori Syndrome", leading her to be dubbed the "sexy queen of K-pop." Writing about the effect of the "Hyori Syndrome" in the industry, an editor from Beautytap said that "the flirty images of K-pop girl groups today can be credited in large part to Hyori pushing the limits"; "Hyori rocked racy outfits, danced provocatively in her videos, and didn't seem afraid to push the limits of what was considered 'acceptable sex appeal' at the time in Korea." A reporter from domestic media outlet Star News wrote that since "10 Minutes" in 2003, Lee created a boom in the industry among women of all ages, and became a trendsetter in the South Korean fashion world.

Having appeared on the front page of newspapers 891 times after the release of "10 Minutes", Lee set a Guinness World Record at the time for the highest number of front-page newspaper appearances. In 2007, The Korea Times named Lee one of 10 Influential Women on the Cultural Scene since 1950, saying that "the Lee Hyori syndrome spread around the country" after the release of "10 Minutes", leading to her becoming a fashion icon and the highest-paid female singer in Korea at that point. Marie Claire included the song in their list of 35 essential K-pop songs, writing that "it was so popular that 2003 was nicknamed 'The Year of Hyori' in Korean media." In a panel of 35 music critics organized by Seoul Shinmun and Melon, "10 Minutes" was ranked the 16th greatest K-pop song of all-time; music critic Subtle said that the song yielded major influence on female idols, which still showed years after its initial release.

References 

2003 debut singles
2003 songs
Lee Hyori songs
Music video controversies
Songs about casual sex